Jus legationis is a Legal Latin term meaning the capacity to send and receive consuls and diplomats.

Latin legal terminology